Nine West, also known as 9 West, is an American online fashion retailer which is based in White Plains, New York. It was founded in 1983 and closed its brick and mortar stores business in 2018. Its products continue to be sold at other retailers.

History 
Nine West was named for its founding location in the Solow Building at 9 West 57th Street in New York City. In 1983, Nine West opened its first specialty retail store in Stamford, Connecticut. In 1986, Nine West launched its first national ad campaign. Nine West first expanded internationally with the opening of a Hong Kong location in 1994. It has since become a brand located in over 800 global locations in 57 countries. 

Initially founded as a fashion footwear brand, Nine West expanded into handbags, sunglasses, legwear, outerwear, jewelry, belts, watches, cold weather accessories, hats, scarves and wraps, and eyewear. After the launch of handbags in 1995, Nine West expanded to dresses, suits and children's footwear.  Through licensing agreements, it also offers eyewear, sunglasses, legwear, outerwear, belts, hats, cold weather accessories, scarves and wraps. In March 1995, Nine West purchased the footwear division of the United States Shoe Corporation, which included the Easy Spirit brand.

In 1999, Nine West was acquired by Jones Apparel Group.

In 2006, Nine West began collaborating with Vivienne Westwood, Thakoon and Sophia Kokosalaki on limited edition "capsule collections". In 2009, Nine West and New Balance collaborated to develop a collection of footwear. Fred Allard served as Creative Director starting in 2006.

On July 7, 2015, the Canadian distributor and retailer of Nine West, the Sherson Group, filed for bankruptcy protection for the Canadian locations.

In April 2018, it was announced that Nine West's U.S. business had filed for bankruptcy and closed all its stores. It was announced that Nine West's business would be closed for good. It was also announced that the Nine West brand would be acquired by Authentic Brands Group.

In popular culture 
In Gwyn Cready's comedic romance novel Tumbling Through Time, Seph Pyle is transported back in time to 1705 after trying on a pair of sandals at the Nine West store in the Pittsburgh airport.

References

External links

 

Shoe companies of the United States
Eyewear brands of the United States
Companies that filed for Chapter 11 bankruptcy in 2018
Clothing companies established in 1983
Clothing companies disestablished in 2018
Retail companies established in 1983
Retail companies disestablished in 2018
1983 establishments in New York City
2018 disestablishments in New York (state)
Companies based in White Plains, New York
Online retailers of the United States
Authentic Brands Group